The Medal of Devotion for National Defense is a military decoration awarded by the Central Military Commission of China, first amended on May 4, 2010, then established on August 1, 2011. It is divided into three levels.

Criteria 
The medal is awarded to military officers, civilian cadres, and soldiers, posthumously to martyrs and those killed in the line of duty, and awarded to those disabled by injuries received in the line of duty. 
 Martyrs are awarded posthumous golden medals,
 A person who dies in the line of duty is awarded a posthumous silver medal,
 A person who is disabled by injuries received in the line of duty is awarded a bronze medal.

Service Ribbon

References 

Awards established in 2011
Military awards and decorations of the People's Liberation Army